"Shout It Out" is a song by Swedish singer Mariette. The song was performed for the first time in Melodifestivalen 2020, where it made it to the final. The song peaked at number 30 on the Swedish single chart.

Charts

References

Mariette Hansson songs

2020 singles
English-language Swedish songs
Melodifestivalen songs of 2020
Songs written by Thomas G:son
2020 songs